Sung Hyang-sim (born 2 December 1999) is a North Korean footballer from Anju City, South Pyongan Province. She plays for Pyongyang City Sports Club and the North Korea women's national football team as a forward.

At the 2017 AFC U-19 Women's Championship, Sung was named the tournament's Most Valuable Player and earned the Golden Ball for most goals scored. The same year, she was nominated for the Asian Player of the Year and Asian Young Footballer of the Year awards by the Asian Football Confederation (AFC) and won the latter. The previous year, she earned the Silver Ball at the 2016 FIFA U-17 Women's World Cup.

Career 
Sung started playing football at age 12 at a state junior sports school. In 2013, she played for North Korea at the 2013 AFC Under-14 Girls Regional Championship East Region and received an award as the Most Valuable Player at the tournament. After this she played in the 2013 AFC U-16 Women's Championship and the 2014 FIFA U-17 Women's World Cup. In 2016, she was a part of North Korea's 2016 FIFA U-17 Women's World Cup squad, where she was awarded the Silver Ball for her performance. Later that year, she was part of North Korea's 2016 FIFA U-20 Women's World Cup team and came on as a substitute in the final against France. Sung chooses to wear the number 2 as her squad number.

In 2017, Sung made her senior debut for the North Korea women's national football team against China and scored a goal after coming on as a substitute. The same year, she was nominated by AFC for the Asian Player of the Year and Asian Young Footballer of the Year awards, eventually winning the latter one. This came after she scored six goals at the 2017 AFC U-19 Women's Championship, was the top scorer and named Most Valuable Player at the tournament.

International goals

Under-16

Under-19

National team

References

External links
 
 

Living people
1999 births
People from South Pyongan
North Korean women's footballers
North Korea women's international footballers
Asian Young Footballer of the Year winners
Women's association football forwards
Footballers at the 2018 Asian Games
Asian Games competitors for North Korea
Universiade medalists in football
Universiade gold medalists for North Korea
Medalists at the 2019 Summer Universiade